The Holy Pictures is a 2008 studio album by David Holmes. The album departs from the eclectic soundtrack-to-an-imaginary-film style of his previous studio albums, in favour of a more personal approach. It was nominated for the 2008 Choice Music Prize, awarded to the best Irish album of the year. The tracks "I Heard Wonders" and "Holy Pictures" were released as singles.

Critical reception 

The album has garnered generally favourable reviews, and is seen as a successful departure from its predecessors. Thom Jurek, writing for AllMusic, called it "engaging, at times stunning", praising the pop aesthetic of the upbeat songs, while remarking that "there is that sadness at this album's heart that draws one in; it doesn't feel like mope or exorcism, just personal". Pitchfork Media added that the closing three songs "seek to recapture a certain back-to-the-womb comfort... and prove an affecting come-down to the preceding songs' sunglasses-at-night swagger". Both critics praised the final song, "The Ballad of Sarah and Jack", referring to it as "gorgeous" and "unspeakably somber". Jurek also favoured the opener, "I Heard Wonders", calling it a "killer track".

The album was seen as reflecting many influences, most notably The Jesus and Mary Chain (particularly Jim Reid's vocal style), Primal Scream and Neu! in its upbeat songs and Brian Eno in its "warm production" and "limpid, wistful instrumentals".

Appearances in other media 
The track "Love Reign Over Me" is featured on the episode "Freddie" (series 3, episode 5) of the UK version of Skins. The track "Holy Pictures" is featured in football video game Pro Evolution Soccer 2010. "Theme / I.M.C." previously appeared on the compilation The Oh Yeah Sessions '08 as "McCready Rides Again". The song "I Heard Wonders" was featured in the opening ceremony of the London 2012 Olympics and, later in 2012, as the theme for the first series of Dara Ó Briain's Science Club.

Track listing 
All music and lyrics written David Holmes, except where noted.

iTunes bonus tracks

Personnel 
Musicians

 David Holmes – vocals (1, 2, 3, 5, 6, 7), electronics (1, 2), CS80 synthesizer (3), glockenspiel (6), programming (1–4, 8, 9), sound effects (3, 4, 6), arrangement (2, 4–8), production (all tracks)
 Leo Abrahams – guitar (1–4, 6), bass (1, 7, 10), six string bass (10), keyboards (1), RMI electric piano (2, 4), guitaret (3, 4, 6, 7, 8, 10), mellotron (4), big string (5), marxophone and hurdy gurdy (7)
 Danny Todd – acoustic guitar and backing vocals (5), vocals (7), additional bass (10)
 Woody Jackson – chamberlin and glockenspiel (2), ring mod (5), recording (2, 5, 6, 8, 9)
 Scott Kinsey – RMI electric piano (5), CS80 synthesizer and toy piano (6), piano and organ (8), chamberlin (9)
 Jon Hopkins – piano and CS1 synthesizer (10)
 Tim Harries – bass (2, 4, 6, 8)
 Jason Falkner – bass (2)
 Donald Skinner – bass (5)
 Jeremy Stacey – drums (1, 6, 7)
 Zack Danziger – drums (4, 5)
 Pati Hilton – backing vocals (3)
 Foy Vance – backing vocals (6), vocals (8)
 Tanya Mellote – additional bass (6), vocals (6, 7)
 Nina Holmes – vocals (8)

Production

 Dave Terry – assistant engineer (1, 2, 4, 6–8, 10)
 Hugo Nicolson – recording (1, 2, 4, 5, 6, 7, 8) mixing (1, 2, 4, 6–10), additional drum programming (2)
 Stephen Hilton – CS80 synthesizer (3), mixing (3, 5)
 Olga Fitzroy – assistant engineer (3, 5)

References 

2008 albums
David Holmes (musician) albums